Ashwin Robert Scott (born 2 June 1985) is a South African rugby union footballer. He plays mostly as a winger.

External links

itsrugby.co.uk profile

Living people
1985 births
South African rugby union players
Rugby union wings
Pumas (Currie Cup) players
People from George, South Africa
SWD Eagles players
Rugby union players from the Western Cape